The Crooked House is a pub and restaurant in South Staffordshire, England.

Its name and distinctive appearance are the result of 19th-century mining subsidence. One side of the building is now approximately  lower than the other.

The entrance to the road leading to it lies within the metropolitan county of the West Midlands, but the Crooked House is located just north of the boundary between Staffordshire and the West Midlands.

History
The Crooked House was built in 1765 and was originally a farmhouse. During the early 19th century, mining in the area caused one side of the building to begin gradually sinking. It later became a public house called the Siden House, siden meaning "crooked" in the local Black Country dialect. The building was later renamed the Glynne Arms after the local landowner,  Sir Stephen Glynne, on whose land it stood.

The building was condemned as unsafe in the 1940s and was scheduled for demolition. Wolverhampton and Dudley Breweries purchased the pub and rescued it by making the structure safe using buttresses and girders to retain its lopsided appearance. The building was put up for sale in 2023.

Optical illusions
The building's leaning walls give rise to optical illusions, as with a gravity hill. These include glasses slowly sliding across "level" tables and a marble appearing to roll uphill.

References

External links
 

Buildings and structures in Dudley
Tourist attractions in the West Midlands (county)
Culture in the West Midlands (region)
Pubs in the West Midlands (county)